Thomas Crawford Galbreath (July 28, 1876 – July 24, 1916) was an American football and baseball player.  He served as the head football coach at Western Maryland College (now McDaniel College) from 1896 to 1898. He attended Harvard University from 1902 to 1903.

References

External links
 

1876 births
1916 deaths
19th-century players of American football
19th-century baseball players
McDaniel Green Terror baseball players
McDaniel Green Terror football coaches
McDaniel Green Terror football players
Harvard University alumni
People from Harford County, Maryland
Players of American football from Maryland